Om Katare, (born Datia, Madhya Pradesh, India) is an Indian actor in the Bollywood and theater industries. He is also a director and playwright under the banner of the Yatri Theatre, which he established in 1979.

Katare's theatre group has presented over 50 plays with over 4,700 shows. He, along with his group, regularly holds performances in Mumbai and the rest of India and internationally. He also conducts theater workshops promoting and encouraging new talent. In the interactive session Fish Tank- ALL ABOUT THEATRE conducted by Skoolz he guided children personally with his direction.

Theatre productions

As an actor and director 

 Ek Masheen Jawani Ki (1979)
 Ek Tha Gadha (1979)
 Qasai Banda (1979)
 Phandi (1980)
 Arre Natwarlal (1980)
 Hai Padosan (1980)
 Rahasya (1981)
 Chor Ke Ghar Mor (1982)
 Danga (1983)
 Govinda Ala Re (1983)
 Shabash Banchharam (1984)
 Sakharam Binder (1985)
 Inse Miliye (1985)
 Unse Mili Nazar (1986)
 Purush (1986)
 Aao Na (1987)
 Jhamele Mein Jhamela (1987)
 Prem Nagar Ki Dagar (1988)
 Chakra (1988)
 Khuda Bachaye Aurat Se (1989)
 Savita Damodar Paranjpe (1989)
 Dilli Uncha Sunti Hai (1991)
 Abhi To Main Jawan Hoon (1992)
 Jaako Rakhe Saiyaan (1993)
 Bhaag Chalein (1993)
 Kaal Chakra (1994)
 Jee Huzoor (1995)
 Doondhte Reh Jaoge (1996)
 Hadh Kar Di Aapne (1997)
 Yeh Kahan Aa Gaye Hum (1997)
 Mann  Karta Hai (1998)
 Ladoo Gopal (1999)
 Mahasagar ( 1999)
 Jaane Do Na (2000)
 Pajee Kahin Ka (2000)
 Rani Ki Kahani (2003)
 Aankhon Aankhon Mein (2004)
 Zaraa Inse Miliye (2004)
 Chandu Ki Chachi (2005)
 Chinta Chhod Chintamani (2008)
 Dadaji Kahein (2009)
 Gaj Foot Inch (2009)
 Baap re Baap (2009)
 Raavanleela (2010)
 Ladoo Gopal
 Yeh Jo Dil Hai na
 Halla Bol
 Teri Meri Prem Kahani
 Magic If
 Bubblegum Boy
 Inspector Matadeen Chand Per (2019)
 Heroine Banoongi Main
 Jeene Bhi Do Yaaron
 Genius Chor (2018)
 Yeh Tera Dil Yeh Mera Dil (2017)
 Perfect Family (2020)

References

Male actors from Madhya Pradesh